Mike Moon (born December 31, 1958) is an American politician serving as a member of the Missouri Senate, who previously served in the Missouri House of Representatives. He is a member of the Republican Party. On August 31, 2021, he announced that he was running for Missouri's 7th congressional district.

Political positions

Abortion
Moon is anti-abortion, citing "putting an end to abortion" in Missouri as one of his top priorities. He does not believe states are obligated to enforce Roe v. Wade, and has introduced several anti-abortion bills during his time as a state representative, including the Never Again Act (which proposed requiring a certain museum to have an exhibit featuring tools used in abortion), the Right to Due Process Act (which proposed defining a human zygote as a person), and House Bill 2285 (which proposed abolishing abortion in Missouri).

In 2017, Moon posted a video of himself butchering chickens on his family farm on social media, chiding his fellow Missouri legislators for not getting to the "heart of the matter" and abolishing abortion in Missouri outright. The video was negatively received by NARAL Pro-Choice Missouri, as well as PETA president Ingrid Newkirk, the latter of whom called for his arrest. Moon, however, denied that he was trying to offend anyone by the video, saying that "[t]he reality is our food is slaughtered[.] . . . I didn’t mean for it [the video] to be demoralizing in any way. It was just something that I was in the middle of and I wasn’t going to go shower or change clothes."

COVID-19
Moon is against face mask mandates and safety measures that regulate businesses to curb the spread of the virus, believing that they threaten personal liberty and "that the economy has been devastated as a result" of them.

Corporate tax
Moon wants to eliminate corporate tax, as well as what he deems as "unnecessary regulation".

Other social issues
Mike Moon has introduced bills allowing parents to not have their children participate in sex education classes, requiring internet service providers to ban "obscene" websites, and prohibiting doctors from giving transgender patients sex reassignment surgery or hormonal treatment.

In 2019, he requested Missouri governor Mike Parson to not allow the replacement of a statue of the Roman goddess Ceres to the top of the Missouri Capitol in Jefferson City, calling the statue a "false god":

Electoral history

State Representative

State Senate

References

External links

1958 births
21st-century American politicians
Living people
Republican Party Missouri state senators
Republican Party members of the Missouri House of Representatives
People from Ash Grove, Missouri